Arthur Edwin Schwind (November 4, 1889 – January 13, 1968) was a Major League Baseball player. He played one game with the Boston Braves on October 3, 1912.

References

External links

Boston Braves players
Major League Baseball third basemen
1889 births
1968 deaths
Baseball players from Fort Wayne, Indiana
Galesburg Pavers players
San Antonio Bronchos players
Dallas Giants players
Beaumont Oilers players
Tacoma Tigers players
Ottawa Senators (baseball) players
People from Sullivan, Illinois